Paris – Soweto is a 1987 album by the South African mbaqanga group Mahlathini and the Mahotella Queens. The album was recorded just after the group reunited in 1986, and was one of the first albums to be recorded specifically for the international audience. The album was recorded in Paris and released internationally on the Celluloid label, and under the group's long-standing Gallo label in South Africa. The first single, "Kazet" (also known as "Gazette") became one of the group's signature tunes.

Paris - Soweto was made-up of re-recordings of Mahlathini & the Queens' biggest hits of the 1960s and 1970s, with the exception of track 4 "Safa Indlala" (which was originally recorded in 1983 for Amaqhawe Omgqashiyo) and track 1 "Kazet" (which was a re-recording of a 1986 hit by fellow South African star Obed Ngobeni).

Track listing
 "Kazet" (Comp.: Obed Ngobeni, West Nkosi)
 "Awuthule Kancane" (Comp.: Nobesuthu Shawe)
 "Thuntshwane Basadi" (Comp.: Marks Mankwane, Rupert Bopape)
 "Safa Indlala" (Comp.: Simon Mahlathini Nkabinde)
 "Re Ya Dumedisa" (Comp.: Marks Mankwane, Rupert Bopape)
 "Ukhulum' Izindaba" (with Amaswazi Emvelo) (Comp.: Bigboy Thusi)
 "Melodi Ya Lla" (Comp.: Rupert Bopape, Shadrack Piliso)
 "Stokvel Jive" (also spelled "Stokfel Jive") (Comp.: West Nkosi)

The international Celluloid/PolyGram editions were released in 1988 on LP and in 1989 on CD, with the CDs containing bonus tracks:
 "Kazet (Dance Mix)" (Remix by Norman Cook)
 Art of Noise feat. Mahlathini & The Mahotella Queens - "Yebo! (Mbaqanga Mix)" (Remix by J. J. Jeczalik)

Mahlathini and the Mahotella Queens albums
1987 albums